Olakur is a village in  Tamil Nadu located in the Villupuram District. The nearest town to Olakur is Tindivanam. 

Olakur railway station is part of the Chennai Suburban Railway.

Cities and towns in Viluppuram district